Trifolium andinum is a species of flowering plant in the family Fabaceae known by the common name Intermountain clover. It is native to the Intermountain West of the United States from Nevada and Arizona to Wyoming and New Mexico. The rare var. podocephalum is endemic to Nevada.

References

andinum